was a village located in Higashiyamanashi District, Yamanashi Prefecture, Japan.

As of 2003, the village had an estimated population of 1,287 and a population density of 9.54 persons per km². The total area was 134.91 km².

On March 22, 2005, Mitomi, along with the town of Makioka (also from Higashiyamanashi District), was merged into the expanded city of Yamanashi.

External links
 Yamanashi official website 

Dissolved municipalities of Yamanashi Prefecture
Yamanashi, Yamanashi